Voetbalvereniging Chevremont is a football club based in Kerkrade, Limburg, Netherlands. The team plays in the Eerste Klasse, the sixth tier of Dutch football, following relegation from the Hoofdklasse in the 2016–17 Hoofdklasse season. The club plays its home games at Sportpark Kaffeberg, Chevremont, a former town which has merged with Kerkrade.

In the 1950–51 and 1951–52 seasons, Chevremont competed at the top level of Dutch football.

References

External links
 Official site

Football clubs in the Netherlands
Football clubs in Kerkrade
Association football clubs established in 1910
1910 establishments in the Netherlands